Sir George Henry Scott-Douglas, 4th Baronet (19 June 1825 – 26 June 1885) was a Conservative Party politician and soldier.

Military career
During his life, he was a captain of the 34th Regiment of Foot from 1843 to 1851 where he was stationed at Athlone, Ireland, and Corfu. He was also Lieutenant-Colonel of the Roxburgh and Selkirk Rifle Volunteers from 1868 to 1885, and Brigadier General of the Royal Company of Archers.

Political career
Harris was elected MP for Roxburghshire in 1874, but lost the seat at the next election in 1880.

Baronetcy
In 1836, upon the death of his father, John James Scott-Douglas, he succeeded as fourth baronet. Upon his death, the title passed to his second son, George Brisbane Scott Douglas.

Family
Scott-Douglas met his wife, Mariquita, who was the eldest daughter of Don Francisco Serran Sanches de Piña, in Gibraltar, and they were married in 1851. Together they had six children, one of whom died in infancy. Their eldest son, James, was due to receive the baronetcy on Scott-Douglas' death; however, on 3 July 1879, while on tour in Zululand, he was killed.

References

External links
 

Scottish Tory MPs (pre-1912)
UK MPs 1874–1880
Baronets in the Baronetage of Great Britain
1825 births
1885 deaths